The 1965 Maine Black Bears football team was an American football team that represented the University of Maine as a member of the Yankee Conference during the 1965 NCAA College Division football season. In its 15th season under head coach Harold Westerman, the team compiled an 8–2 record (5–0 against conference opponents), won the Yankee Conference championship, and lost to East Carolina in the 1965 Tangerine Bowl. Alan Riley and Walter Hirst were the team captains.

Schedule

References

Maine
Maine Black Bears football seasons
Yankee Conference football champion seasons
Maine Black Bears football